Krutinka is an urban locality (a work settlement) and the administrative center of Krutinsky District of Omsk Oblast, Russia, located  northwest of Omsk. Population:

References

Urban-type settlements in Omsk Oblast